The Barrow, later Crawley-Boevey Baronetcy (pronounced "Boovey"), of Highgrove (Hygrove House, Minsterworth) in the County of Gloucester, is a title in the Baronetage of Great Britain. It was created on 22 January 1784 for Charles Barrow, Member of Parliament for Gloucester, with remainder to Thomas Crawley-Boevey, who succeeded as second Baronet. Crawley-Boevey was husband of Ann, granddaughter of Thomas Barrow, brother of the first Baronet. His grandfather Thomas Crawley had on inheriting Flaxley Abbey in 1726 assumed the additional surname of Boevey. Flaxley Abbey had been purchased in 1648 by the merchant, lawyer and philosopher James Boevey (1622–1696) and his half-brother William Boevey. The second Baronet was succeeded by his eldest son, the third Baronet. He was High Sheriff of Gloucestershire from 1831 to 1832. His grandson (who succeeded his father), the fifth Baronet, was High Sheriff of Gloucestershire in 1882.

Barrow, later Crawley-Boevey baronets, of Highgrove (1784)

Sir Charles Barrow, 1st Baronet (1708–1789)
Sir Thomas Crawley-Boevey, 2nd Baronet (1744–1818)
Sir Thomas Crawley-Boevey, 3rd Baronet (1769–1847)
Sir Martin Hyde Crawley-Boevey, 4th Baronet (1812–1862)
Sir Thomas Hyde Crawley-Boevey, 5th Baronet (1837–1912)
Sir Francis Hyde Crawley-Boevey, 6th Baronet (1868–1928)
Sir Launcelot Valentine Hyde Crawley-Boevey, 7th Baronet (1900–1968)
Sir Thomas Michael Blake Crawley-Boevey, 8th Baronet (1928–2021)
Sir Thomas Hyde Crawley-Boevey, 9th Baronet (b. 1958)

The heir apparent is the current holder's elder son, James Ian Crawley-Boevey (b. 1992).

Notes

References
Kidd, Charles, Williamson, David (editors). Debrett's Peerage and Baronetage (1990 edition). New York: St Martin's Press, 1990, 

Crawley-Boevey
1784 establishments in Great Britain
People from Cotswold District
Baronetcies created with special remainders